Randhari is a 2015 Maldivian film directed by Mohamed Aboobakuru and starring Ahmed Nimal, Fathimath Azifa and Ali Azim. It was produced by Hussain Rasheed under Fariva Films. The film was released on 26 February 2015.

Cast 
 Ahmed Nimal as Razzaq
 Fathimath Azifa as Aisha
 Ali Azim as Shahidh
 Ibrahim Jihad as Waseem
 Arifa Ibrahim as Mariyam
 Mohamed Waheed Waseem's father
 Aminath Muhusina
 Mohamed Najah as Policeman
 Fathimath Mufliha

Soundtrack

Release and response 
The film premiered on 26 February 2015 at Olympus. It performed below average at the box office and was digitally released on 25 May 2015.

References

2015 films
Maldivian drama films
2015 drama films
Dhivehi-language films